The Jamaican becard (Pachyramphus niger) is a species of bird in the family Tityridae. Its genus, Pachyramphus, has traditionally been placed in Cotingidae or Tyrannidae, but evidence strongly suggest it is better placed in Tityridae.

Distribution and habitat
It is endemic to Jamaica. Its natural habitats are subtropical or tropical moist lowland forests and subtropical or tropical moist montane forests.

References

 Raffaele, Herbert; James Wiley, Orlando Garrido, Allan Keith & Janis Raffaele (2003) Birds of the West Indies, Christopher Helm, London.

Jamaican becard
Endemic birds of Jamaica
Jamaican becard
Jamaican becard
Taxonomy articles created by Polbot